The Maly Lip is a river in Sverdlovsk Oblast, Russia, a right tributary of the Vogulka, which in turn is a tributary of the Sylva.

References 

Rivers of Sverdlovsk Oblast